Following is a list of delegates at the 2nd Comintern World Congress, held in Petrograd and Moscow from 19 July through 7 August 1920.

Full delegates
Armenia: Communist Party of Armenia
Avis
Nseratjan
Austria: Communist Party of Austria
Reisler
Karl Steinhardt
Anna Strömer
Karl Toman
Azerbaijan: Communist Party of Azerbaijan
Sapunov
Belgium: Young Socialist Guard
Eduard Van Overstraeten
Bulgaria: Communist Party of Bulgaria
Khristo Kabakchiev
Nikola Maximov
N. Shablin (Ivan Nedelkov)
Czechoslovakia: Union of Communist Groups
Ivan Olbracht
Czechoslovakia: National Confederation of Labor
Břetislav Hůla
Czechoslovakia: Left Wing of the Social Democratic Party
Miloš Vaněk
Antonín Zápotocký
Denmark: Communist Party of Denmark
Marie-Sophie Nielsen
Denmark: Left Socialist Party
Jörgensen
East Galicia/Bukovina: Communist Party of Galicia and Bukovina
Baral
Levitsky
Mitra
Estonia: Communist Party of Estonia
Hans Pöögelmann
Rudolf Vakmann
Finland: Communist Party of Finland
Otto Ville Kuusinen
Lauri Letonmäki
Johan Henrik Lumivuokko
Kullervo Manner
Jukka Rahja
France: Committee for the Third International
Raymond Lefebvre
S. Mineff (Vanini)
Alfred Rosmer
France: Socialist Party of France
Henri Guilbeaux
Jacques Sadoul
Georgia: Communist Party of Georgia
Filipp Makharadze
Mikadze
Mikha-Tschakhaya (Barsov)
Silvestr Todriya
Wakashidze
Wardunjan
Germany: Communist Party of Germany
Willi Budich
Paul Levi
Ernst Meyer
Jakob Walcher
Rosi Wolfstein
Germany: Communist Youth
Leinhardt
Great Britain: British Socialist Party
William McLaine
Tom Quelch
Great Britain: Industrial Workers of the World
Richard Beech
Great Britain: Shop Stewards Movement
Willie Gallacher
J. T. Murphy
David Ramsay
Jack Tanner
Hungary: Communist Party of Hungary
Mátyás Rákosi
Endre Rudnyansky
Eugen Varga
India: (no party affiliation)
Abani Mukherji
Indonesia: Communist Party of Indonesia
Henk Sneevliet "Maring"
Tan Malaka
Ireland: Communist Party of Ireland
"Z"
"NN"
"X"
Ireland: Industrial Workers of the World
 Roddy Connolly ("N")
Ireland: Irish Labour Party
 Patrick Quinlan ("Y")
Italy: Socialist Party of Italy
Nicola Bombacci
Antonio Graziadei
Luigi Polano
Giacinto Menotti Serrati
Korea: Socialist Party of Korea
Pak Chin-sun
Latvia: Communist Party of Latvia
Dāvids Beika
Blank-Berg
K. Krastiņš
Pēteris Stučka
Lithuania: Communist Party of Lithuania
Vincas Mickevičius-Kapsukas
Rasikas
Mexico: Communist Party of Mexico
M.N. Roy
Charles Shipman ("Frank Seaman")
Netherlands: Communist Party of Holland
Jan Proost Jansen
David Wijnkoop
Norway:
Kristian Kristensen (A)
Einar Gerhardsen (NSU)
Jakob Friis (A)
Sverre Krogh (NSU)
Haavard Langseth (A)
Alfred Madsen (LO)
Hans Medby (NSU)
Augusta Aasen (A) – died during the Congress
Olav Scheflo (A)
Sigrid Syvertsen (A)
Persia: Communist Party of Persia
Avatis Soltanzadeh
Poland: Communist Party of Poland
Julian Marchlewski (Karski)
Russia: Russian Communist Party (bolsheviks)
Aliev
Alekseev
Andre Andreev
Inesa Armand
Artem (F.F. Sergeev)
Akhundov
Baitursunov
Yan Karlovich Berzin
Vasily Blakitny
Nikolay Bukarin
Chernov
Raya Dunayevskaya
Feliks Dzerzhinsky
Abel Enukidze
Serafima Gopner
Firzov
Galimdzhan Ibrahimov
Idrisov
E.N. Ignatov
Adolf Joffe
Mikhail Kalinin
Faizullah Khojaev
Felix Kohn
Alexandra Kollontai
Alexander Krasnoshchyokov
Nikolay Krestinsky
Nadezhda Krupskaya
Vladimir Lenin
Aleksandr Lozovsky
Anatoly Lunacharsky
Majorova
Dmitry Manuilsky
Mereshin
Mikhail Olminsky
Valerian Osinsky
Mikhail Pavlovich-Weltmann
Stanislav Pestkovsky
Mikhail Pokrovsky
Posner
Yevgeny Preobrazhensky
Karl Radek
Rafes
Christian Rakovsky
Ramonov
David Riazanov
Rivkin
Rodzaev
Jānis Rudzutaks
Aleksey Rykov
Oscar Ryvkin
Sadovskaia
G.I. Safarov
Sakharov
Sekhibgarey Said-Galiev
Leonid Serebryakov
Alexander Shlyapnikov
 Alexander Shumsky
Nikolai Skrypkin
Petr Smidovich
Vladimir Sorin
Grigory Sokolnikov
Iurii Steklov
Mirsäyet Soltanğäliev
Taetlin
Viktor Taratuta
Leon Trotsky
Mikhail Tomsky
Grigori Tsiperovich
Vadim Vatin
Voronova
Emilien Yaroslavsky
Yanson
Zeitlin
Grigory Zinoviev
Spain: National Confederation of Labor
Ángel Pestaña
Sweden: Left Social Democratic Party of Sweden
Kata Dahlström
Sven Linderot
Switzerland: Communist Party of Switzerland (Forderung)
Backer
Jakob Herzog
Switzerland: Social Democratic Party Left
Walther Bringolf
Jules Humbert-Droz
United States: Communist Party of America
Louis Fraina
Alexander Stocklitski
United States: Communist Labor Party of America
Alexander Bilan
Edward I. Lindgren ("Flynn")
Eadmon MacAlpine
John Reed
United States: Independent Socialist Youth
Chabrow
Jurgis
Yugoslavia: Communist Party of Yugoslavia
Ilija Milkić
Communist Youth International
Sigi Bamatter (Switzerland)
Willi Münzenberg (Germany)
Lazar Shatzkin (Russia)

Consultative Delegates (voice, no vote)
Australia: Communist League
Freeman
Susenko
Austria: Poale Zion
Cohn-Eber
Bukhara: Communist Party of Bukhara
Machamadyer
China: Chinese Socialist Workers Party
Lao Hsiu-chao
An En-Hak
Czechoslovakia: Communist Group
Malinow
Sonnenstein
Estonia: Independent Socialist Party
Jonas
Finland: Communist Party of Finland
Edvard Gylling
Kustaa Rovio
Tammenoksa
France: Revolutionary Student Group
M. Goldenberg
France: Section française de l'Internationale ouvrière
Marcel Cachin
Ludovic-Oscar Frossard
France:(no party affiliation designated)
A.E. Abramovich
Germany: Independent Social Democratic Party (USPD)
Arthur Crispien
Ernst Däumig
Wilhelm Dittmann
Germany: Communist Workers Party (KAPD)
Jan Appel
Franz Jung
(Otto Rühle and August Merges were also sent as delegates of the KPAD after the party lost touch with Appel and Jung. They however refused to participate in the congress.
Germany: General Workers' Union of Germany (AAUD)
Hermann Knüfken
Great Britain: National League of Labour Youth
Walton Newbold
Marjory Newbold
Great Britain: Workers' Socialist Federation
Sylvia Pankhurst
Helen Crawfurd
Iceland: Icelandic Labour Party
Brynjólfur Bjarnason
Hendrik Siemsen Ottósson
India
M.P.B.T. Acharya
Italy: Socialist Party of Italy
Amadeo Bordiga
Emileo Columbino
D'Aragona
Paverini
Vincenzo Vacirca
Mexico: Communist Party of Mexico
Helen Allan
Persia: Communist Party of Persia
Hassanov
Orudshev
Russia: Communist Bund
Mosei Litvakov
Aron Weinstein
Russia: Party of Revolutionary Communism
Saposhnikov
Ustinov
United States: (no party affiliation specified)
Gildea
Executive Committee of the Communist International
Angelica Balabanova (Russia)
Lev Karakhan (Russia)
Gustav Klinger (Russia)
Menshoi

See also
List of delegates of the 1st Comintern congress

References

 
R.A. Archer (trans.), Second Congress of the Communist International: Minutes of the Proceedings  [in two volumes]. (London: New Park Publications, 1977), v. 2, pp. 297–326.

External links
 "Minutes of the Second Congress of the Communist International", at marxists.org

Comintern
2nd Comintern congress